This page is a timeline of e-commerce. Major launches, milestones and other major events are included.

Overview

Timeline

See also

 Timeline of online video
 Timeline of social media
 Timeline of online advertising

References 

 
E-commerce